The 1983 National Panasonic Open was a women's tennis tournament played on outdoor grass courts at the Milton Tennis Centre in Brisbane, Australia that was part of the 1983 Virginia Slims World Championship Series. It was the fourth edition of the tournament and was held from 14 November through 20 November 1983. First-seeded Pam Shriver won the singles title and earned $27,500 first-prize money.

Finals

Singles
 Pam Shriver defeated  Wendy Turnbull 6–4, 7–5
 It was Shriver's 2nd singles title of the year and the 5th of her career.

Doubles
 Anne Hobbs /  Wendy Turnbull defeated  Pam Shriver /  Sharon Walsh 6–3, 6–4
 It was Hobbs' 4th title of the year and the 5th of her career. It was Turnbull's 4th title of the year and the 55th of her career.

Prize money

References

External links
 ITF tournament edition details
 Tournament draws

National Panasonic Open
National Panasonic Open
National Panasonic Open
National Panasonic Open
National Panasonic Open, 1983